The Thea Foss Waterway, formerly the City Waterway, is a north–south inlet of Commencement Bay separating downtown Tacoma, Washington, from the Port of Tacoma.

History

The City Waterway was created in 1902 through a dredging operation proposed by the Northern Pacific Railway and led by the U.S. Army Corps of Engineers. In 1989, the waterway was renamed to honor Thea Foss, who founded the Foss Maritime Company on the inlet in 1889.

Cleanup and redevelopment

During the early 20th century, the Thea Foss Waterway was a thriving industrial center. Industry began to dwindle in the area, and by 1981, the Thea Foss Waterway was almost entirely abandoned. In 1983, the United States Environmental Protection Agency (EPA) listed the Thea Foss and Wheeler-Osgood waterways as part of the larger  Commencement Bay Superfund site.  The final cap from the Superfund cleanup action on the Thea Foss Waterway occurred back in February 2006.  
As of 2010, planned development is underway along the waterway. When complete, the new development will feature parks, residential areas, and office space. A public esplanade will run along the length of the waterway. 7 of the 15 development sites are either constructed or have specific plans for redevelopment. The project is overseen by the Foss Waterway Development Authority Board (FWDA). 

Local leaders see the Thea Foss Waterway as an economic opportunity, and seek to restore it to the commercial hub that it once was.

See also
Puyallup River
Hylebos Creek

References

External links

Thea Foss Waterway Development Authority
Thea Foss Waterway Cleanup - City of Tacoma

Geography of Tacoma, Washington
Bodies of water of Pierce County, Washington
Landforms of Puget Sound